"Mean It" is a song by American singer Lauv and American indie pop band LANY. It was released on November 14, 2019 as the seventh single from Lauv's debut studio album, How I'm Feeling (2020).

Background
Speaking about the track, Lauv stated "I started 'Mean It' from the perspective of what I thought somebody might want to say to me (I’m not perfect and I’ll be the first to admit it). Paul [Klein] and I had been talking about working together for a long time, then one day I texted him the idea for the song and it just clicked".

Music video
The music video for "Mean It" was released on December 17, 2019. Set in the deserts of Los Angeles, it features Lauv and LANY's lead singer Paul Klein dancing around painted red rocks and a vintage convertible car.

Charts

Certifications

References

2019 singles
2019 songs
Lauv songs
LANY songs
Songs written by Michael Pollack (musician)
Songs written by Lauv
Songs written by John Hill (record producer)